Brachmia infuscatella is a moth of the family Gelechiidae. It is found on the Azores.

References

Moths described in 1940
Brachmia
Moths of Europe